WOW Hits 2005 is a two-disc compilation album of hit songs that were selected to represent the best in contemporary Christian music. It was released on October 5, 2004.  The album includes thirty one songs plus three bonus tracks. It features songs by Steven Curtis Chapman, Newsboys, MercyMe, Jars of Clay, and many more high-profile groups and singers. The album peaked at No. 29 on the Billboard 200.  It was certified as platinum in the US in 2005 by the Recording Industry Association of America (RIAA).  The album was certified as gold in Canada in 2006 by the Canadian Recording Industry Association (CRIA).

Track listing

Charts

Weekly charts

Year-end charts

See also
 WOW Hits

References

External links
 WOW Hits official website
 Find all the WOW HITS
 WOW Hits online

2004 compilation albums
WOW series albums
WOW Hits albums